The 8th Pan American Games were held in San Juan, Puerto Rico from July 1 to July 15, 1979.

Medals

Silver

Men's discus throw: Bradley Cooper

Results by event

See also
Bahamas at the 1976 Summer Olympics

Nations at the 1979 Pan American Games
1979
Pan American Games